John Harlacher is an actor, stage director, and filmmaker based in New York City.

He has directed one feature film: Urchin which was released theatrically in February 2007. He is Creative Director of The Enemy, a digital film group. He attended Brooklyn College.

As a stage director, he directed Cats Can See The Devil written by Tom X. Chao and choreographed by Alex Timbers, and the Halloween Event Nightmare Haunted House, created by Timothy Haskell.

As an actor, he played Jessie in the indie film Love Simple. He also is a member of the Barefoot Theatre Company, and appeared in their revival of Rats by Israel Horovitz, and the stage version of Dog Day Afternoon among others.

External links

Chainsaw Awards Interview
Barefoot Theatre Company
Nightmare Haunted House

Year of birth missing (living people)
Living people
American film directors
American male screenwriters
American theatre directors
Brooklyn College alumni
Male actors from New York City
Screenwriters from New York (state)